Operation Peregrine is a 1983 role-playing game adventure for Space Opera published by Fantasy Games Unlimited.

Contents
Operation Peregrine involves players in a mystery which contains numerous subplots, in which the player characters are out to solve the mystery of a religious leader who has been kidnapped in the Gatatruit Octant by a band of men who invaded the cult temple.

Reception
Jerry Epperson reviewed Operation Peregrine in Space Gamer No. 70. Epperson commented that "Operation Peregrine is probably one of the better Space Opera modules.  It provides a lot for the gaming dollar - I have used the octant described in the book as a basis for a series of adventures and have transposed a lot of the alien races into other quadrants.  The puzzle itself is challenging, and inexperienced players (read: those of the strictly 'blast-it-and-move-on' mentality) will find it a difficult one to solve.  I would recommend this to anyone gamemastering an SFRPG who is looking for a change of pace."

References

Role-playing game supplements introduced in 1983
Space Opera adventures